Taalaybek Kadyraliyev (born 7 September 1968) is a Kyrgyzstani former boxer. He competed in the men's bantamweight event at the 2000 Summer Olympics.

References

External links
 

1968 births
Living people
Kyrgyzstani male boxers
Olympic boxers of Kyrgyzstan
Boxers at the 2000 Summer Olympics
Place of birth missing (living people)
Asian Games medalists in boxing
Boxers at the 1994 Asian Games
Boxers at the 1998 Asian Games
Boxers at the 2002 Asian Games
Asian Games bronze medalists for Kyrgyzstan
Medalists at the 2002 Asian Games
Bantamweight boxers
20th-century Kyrgyzstani people
21st-century Kyrgyzstani people